Pippin or Pepin is a given name and surname. It is a masculine given name of Frankish origin with uncertain meaning. The name was borne by various members of the Carolingian family that ruled the Austrasian Empire in the Middle Ages, in what is now France and the western parts of Germany; most notably Pepin the Short, the first Carolingian king of the Franks and father of Charlemagne. Other variations of the name include Pipin, Pépin (French), Pippen, Pepijn (Dutch), Peppino or Pepino (Italian), and Pepe (Spanish).

Origin 
Wider use of the first name Pepin and its derivatives stem from the Carolingian kings. There are various explanations of the meaning of the name:

 In Spanish and Italian the name Pepe or Pepin is a shortening or nickname for Jose, Giuseppe, Jusepe, which all are names for Joseph. It's unsure if the early medieval name of Pepin also derives from Joseph.
 Derived from the Frankish word bib meaning "to tremble" (compare modern Dutch bibberen, meaning to tremble or shiver), thus it could mean "awe-inspiring".
 Late-formed examples of the English surname may alternatively be from Old French pepin or pipin ‘seed of a fruit’, and thus a metonymic occupational name for a gardener or grower of fruit trees.
 Dutch sources suggest that the name Pepijn is an infantile corruption of Wilbert or Wilbrecht meaning will and bright, where Wilbert gets shortened into Wilbo which morphed into Pippo and finally into Pepin.

People

Carolingians
 Pepin of Landen (c. 580–640), nicknamed the Elder, sometimes listed as a saint
 Pepin of Herstal (c. 635–714), nicknamed the Middle
 Pepin the Short or Pippin the Younger (c. 714–768), father of Charlemagne
 Pepin the Hunchback (c. 769 – 811), first son of Charlemagne
 Pepin of Italy (777–810), second son of Charlemagne, born Carloman and later named Pepin
 Pepin I of Aquitaine (797–838), grandson of Charlemagne, son of Louis the Pious
 Pepin II of Aquitaine (823–864), son of Pepin I of Aquitaine
 Pepin, Count of Vermandois (817–850), grandson of Pepin of Italy

Other people
 Clermont Pépin (1926–2006), Canadian pianist, composer and teacher
 Jacques Pépin (born 1935), French chef, television personality and writer
 Paula Nenette Pepin (1908–1990), French composer, pianist and lyricist
 Shiloh Pepin (1999–2009), sirenomelia patient
 Théophile Pépin (1826–1904), French mathematician
 Victor Pépin (1780–1845), American circus performer and owner
 Dan Pippin (1926–1965), basketball player
 Donald Pippin (Broadway director) (1926–2022), American theatrical musical director and conductor
 Donald Pippin (opera director) (1926–2021), American pianist, founder of Pocket Opera
 Horace Pippin (1888–1946), self-taught African-American painter
 Robert B. Pippin (born 1948), American philosopher
 Pepín (footballer, born 1931), Spanish footballer, real name José Casas
 Ludwig Lachner (1910–2003), German footballer and manager nicknamed "Pipin"
 Pippin Drysdale (born 1943), Australian ceramicist and art instructor, Australia's highest earning ceramic artist
 Pepín (footballer, born 1996), Equatoguinean footballer, real name José Machin

Characters
 a character in the novel Moby-Dick by Herman Melville
 the nickname of Peregrin Took in J.R.R. Tolkien's The Lord of the Rings
 the protagonist of the novel The Short Reign of Pippin IV by John Steinbeck
 the yellow dog in a picture book series by K. V. Johansen
 the little boy in the BBC children's programme Pogles' Wood
 the dog in the BBC children's programme Come Outside
 Pippin, an American musical based on Pepin the Hunchback
 a mercenary soldier member of the Band of the Hawk in Berserk (manga)

See also
 
 Pippen, surname
 Saint Pepin (disambiguation)

References